Rubus concameratus, the West Virginia blackberry, is a rare North American species of flowering plant in the rose family. It has been found only in the state of West Virginia in the east-central United States.

The genetics of Rubus is extremely complex, so that it is difficult to decide on which groups should be recognized as species. There are many rare species with limited ranges such as this. Further study is suggested to clarify the taxonomy.

References

External links
photo of herbarium specimen at Missouri Botanical Garden, collected in West Virginia in 1953

concameratus
Plants described in 1953
Flora of West Virginia